is a city located in Hyōgo Prefecture, Japan. , the city had an estimated population of 258,497 in 108,688 households and a population density of 1,900 persons per km².

Geography 
Kakogawa located in southern Hyōgo prefecture, in the eastern part of the Harima Plain with central city area spreading over the east bank of the Kakogawa River estuary. A large portion of city is reclaimed land from the Seto Inland Sea and is mostly devoted to heavy industry. There is a completely different landscape between the southern part of the city, which has industrial areas and large-scale mass retailers, and the northern part, which is mostly rural.

Neighbouring municipalities 
Hyōgo Prefecture
 Akashi
 Takasago
 Himeji
 Kasai
 Miki
 Ono
 Harima
 Inami
 Harima
 Inami

Climate
Kakogawa has a Humid subtropical climate (Köppen Cfa) characterized by warm summers and cool winters with light to no snowfall.  The average annual temperature in Kakogawa is 15.4 °C. The average annual rainfall is 1527 mm with September as the wettest month. The temperatures are highest on average in August, at around 26.5 °C, and lowest in January, at around 4.9 °C.

Demographics
Per Japanese census data, the population of Kakogawa rose rapidly in the 1970s and 1980s and has now leveled.

History
The area of Kakogawa is part of ancient Harima Province and is the location of numerous Kofun period burial mounds. During the Sengoku period it developed as a castle town and in the Edo Period as a post station on the San'yōdō highway connecting the Kinai region with western Japan. The town of Kakogawa was established on April 1, 1889 with the creation of the modern municipalities system. It was raised to city status on June 15, 1950. Kakogawa became a  Special city on April 1, 2002 with increased local autonomy.

Government
Kakogawa has a mayor-council form of government with a directly elected mayor and a unicameral city council of 31 members. Kakogawa contributes four members to the Hyogo Prefectural Assembly. In terms of national politics, the city is part of Hyōgo 10th district of the lower house of the Diet of Japan.  Akashi is governed by Mayor Fusaho Izumi, an independent.

Economy
Kakogawa is located within the Hanshin Industrial Area and Harima Seaside Industrial Area and is a center for heavy industry, including steel mills, refineries and chemical processing. Kobe Steel's Kakogawa Steel Works is a major employer. Due to its transportation connections and location,  with easy access to Himeji (about 10 minutes), Kobe (about 30 minutes) and Osaka (about 50 minutes) by train, numerous bedroom communities have developed for commuters to Kobe and Osaka.

Education
Kakogawa has 28 public elementary schools and 12 public middle schools operated by the city government and six public high schools operated by the Hyōgo Prefectural Department of Education. Hyogo University is located in Kakogawa. The city also operates one special education school for the handicapped. The nursing school of University of Hyogo is located in Akashi.

Transportation

Railway 
 JR West – San'yō Main Line (JR Kobe Line)
  - 
 JR West – Kakogawa Line
  -  -  - 
 Sanyo Electric Railway - Main Line
  -  -

Highways 
  San'yō Expressway
  (Kobe, Okayama, Hiroshima, Shimonoseki)
  (Kobe, Okayama)

Sister city relations
 - Maringá, Brazil, from July 1973
 - Auckland, New Zealand, from May 1992

Local attractions
Kakurin-ji - Buddhist temple with Taishidō completed in 1112, and Main Hall in 1397. Both are National Treasures of Japan.
Saijō Kofun Cluster, National Historic Site

Special Dishes 
Katsumeshi is a specialty of Kakogawa. The dish is essentially a beef cutlet served on top of plate of rice with demi-glace sauce.

Notable people from Kakogawa
 Shinsaku Himeda, Japanese cinematographer.
 Tomonori Jinnai, Japanese comedian, tarento, and presenter
 Kōhei Funae, Japanese professional shogi player ranked 6-dan
 Juri Hara, Japanese professional baseball player (pitcher, Tokyo Yakult Swallows)
 Shigetoshi Hasegawa, Japanese former relief pitcher in Major League Baseball, best-selling author and television personality
 Noizi Ito, Japanese light novel and video game artist (Shakugan no Shana)
 Hiromitsu Kanki, Japanese former professional shogi player who achieved the rank of 7-dan
 Toshiaki Kubo, Japanese professional shogi player ranked 9-dan
 Toshiaki Nishioka, Japanese former professional boxer 
 Megumi Ōji, Japanese actress
 Sachi Tainaka, Japanese singer and J-pop idol
 Kozo Takase, Japanese announcer and news anchor
 Masaya Takatsuka, Japanese voice actor
 Juri Ueno, Japanese actress
 Tomomi Ogawa,  musician

See also
Higashi-Kakogawa

References

External links

 Kakogawa City official website 
 

 
Cities in Hyōgo Prefecture
Populated coastal places in Japan